Taygetis rectifascia is a species of butterfly of the family Nymphalidae. It is found in the southeastern and southern Brazilian states of Rio de Janeiro, São Paulo, Paraná and Santa Catarina at altitudes ranging from 300 to 1,200 meters. It has also been found in other southeastern states of Brazil as well as in south western Ecuador.

Adults have been recorded year round.

References

Butterflies described in 1907
Euptychiina
Fauna of Brazil
Nymphalidae of South America